Gerrish-Higgins School District serves 1750 students in a  area in Roscommon County, Michigan. It consists of two elementary schools, a middle school, and a high school.

School Board 
Superintendent: Dr. Millie Park Mellgren

Schools 
Roscommon High School
Roscommon Middle School
Roscommon Elementary School
St. Helen Elementary School

School districts in Michigan
Education in Roscommon County, Michigan